"The Great Filling Station Hold Up"  is a song written and performed by American popular music singer-songwriter Jimmy Buffett. It was first released on his 1973 album A White Sport Coat and a Pink Crustacean and was his first single from that album. The single reached No. 58 on the US Country chart in 1973.

The song appears on Live at Fenway Park, a live album that opened with an acoustic set consisting of "Changes in Latitudes, Changes in Attitudes", "The Great Filling Station Holdup" and "Pencil Thin Mustache".  The album also includes all songs from Songs You Know By Heart, except "He Went to Paris".

History
The song is about two robbers holding up a filling station and the aftermath of getting caught shortly after the robbery in a honky tonk, where both robbers are drunk on beer they bought with the cash they stole. Buffett got the idea to write the song after finding amusement in a newspaper article about recovered property from a holdup.

Soon after the release of the single, with "Why Don't We Get Drunk" as its B-side, it was reported that it had sold over 50,000 copies just to jukebox operators, according to B.J. McElvee, country promotion manager for ABC-Dunhill Records. Billboard magazine reported that only the A-side was promoted to country radio, because the word "screw" (repeatedly used in "Why Don't We Get Drunk") was not generally acceptable in country radio programming at the time; however, "Why Don't We Get Drunk" was played by some "underground" stations on FM radio. "Why Don't We Get Drunk" was identified by Billboard as a "jukebox favorite" more than three years after its original release.

Chart performance

Notes

1973 songs
Jimmy Buffett songs
Songs written by Jimmy Buffett
Dunhill Records singles